The year 655 BC was a year of the pre-Julian Roman calendar. In the Roman Empire, it was known as year 99 Ab urbe condita . The denomination 655 BC for this year has been used since the early medieval period, when the Anno Domini calendar era became the prevalent method in Europe for naming years.

Events

By place

Egypt 
 King Psamtik I marches into Philistia (south-western Levant) in pursuit of Assyrian forces as he consolidates his authority while avoiding territorial expansion.

Greece 
 Stagira on the Chalkidiki peninsula is founded by Ionian settlers from Andros.

Births

Deaths

References